Antati is a unique kind of Tamil poetry, constructed such that the last or ending word of each verse becomes the first word of the next verse. 

In some instances, the last word of the series of verses becomes the beginning of the very first verse, thus making the poem "a true garland of verses". The term is a portmanteau, since in Tamil, anta(m) means "end", and ati means "beginning". The Shaiva saint Karaikal Ammaiyar was the first poet to compose an antati.

Antatis
 Arpudha Tiruvantati by Karaikal Ammaiyar
 Mutal Tiruvantati by Poigai Alvar 
 Irantam Tiruvantati by Bhoothath Alvar 
 Munram Tiruvantati by Peyalvar 
 Tiruvaymoli by Nammalvar
 Kanninun Cirutampu by Madurakavi Alvar
 Abirami Antati by Abirami Pattar
 Saraswati antati by Kambar

See also
  Anadiplosis

References

Tamil poetry